Maya Bamert (born December 7, 1979 in Lachen) is a Swiss bobsledder who has competed since 2003. She finished eighth in the two-woman event at the 2006 Winter Olympics in Turin.

Bamert also competed in the FIBT World Championships, earning her best finish of fifth in the two-woman event at St. Moritz in 2007.

Career highlights

Olympic Winter Games
2006 - Torino, 8th with Martina Feusi
World Championships
2005 - Calgary, 13th with Regula Sterki
2007 - St. Moritz, 5th with Anne Dietrich
European Championships
2008 - Cesana,  3rd with Anne Dietrich

References
 Bobspeed.ch profile 
 
 
 
 2006 bobsleigh two-woman results

1979 births
Bobsledders at the 2006 Winter Olympics
Living people
Olympic bobsledders of Switzerland
Swiss female bobsledders